Jan Börje Möller (born 17 September 1953) is a Swedish former professional footballer who played as a goalkeeper. Starting off his career with Malmö FF, he went on to represent also Bristol City, Toronto Blizzard, Helsingborgs IF, and Trelleborgs FF during a career that spanned between 1971 and 1993. A full international between 1979 and 1988, he won 17 caps for the Sweden national team and represented his country at the 1978 FIFA World Cup. In 1979, he was awarded Guldbollen as Sweden's best footballer of the year.

Club career
Möller had a successful 16-year career for Malmö FF during the 1970s and 1980s (two different spells), appearing in the 1978–79 European Cup final against Nottingham Forest, a 0–1 loss in Munich. He also played for Helsingborgs IF, Bristol City of England, Toronto Blizzard of Canada (following his former manager at Malmö, Bob Houghton, to both clubs), and Trelleborgs FF, retiring professionally at the age of 40; in 1979, he was awarded the Guldbollen.

International career 
Möller was a Swedish international on 17 occasions, and was on squad for the 1978 FIFA World Cup in Argentina, as a backup, along with Göran Hagberg, to Ronnie Hellström.

Honours
Malmö FF
Allsvenskan: 1974, 1975, 1977, 1985, 1986, 1987, 1988
Swedish Champion: 1974, 1975, 1977, 1986, 1988
Swedish Cup: 1973, 1974, 1975, 1978, 1980, 1984, 1986
Individual
Guldbollen: 1979

References

External links

Toronto Blizzard stats

1953 births
Living people
Footballers from Malmö
Swedish footballers
Footballers from Skåne County
Association football goalkeepers
Allsvenskan players
Malmö FF players
Helsingborgs IF players
Trelleborgs FF players
Bristol City F.C. players
North American Soccer League (1968–1984) players
Toronto Blizzard (1971–1984) players
Sweden international footballers
1978 FIFA World Cup players
Swedish expatriate footballers
Expatriate footballers in England
Expatriate soccer players in Canada
Swedish expatriate sportspeople in Canada
Swedish expatriate sportspeople in the United Kingdom